Francisco Escos is an Argentine football manager and former player who played in Argentina for Temperley and Estudiantes, in the NASL between 1971 and 1978 for the Rochester Lancers and in the Major Indoor Soccer League for the Buffalo Stallions from 1979 to 1981. In 1977, he was named to the Rochester Lancers Team of the Decade.

In 1984, Escos coached the Buffalo Storm of the United Soccer League.  He later served as an assistant coach and the general manager of the Rochester Rhinos.

References

External links
 NASL/MISL career stats
 Francisco Escos at BDFA.com.ar 

1942 births
Living people
Argentine footballers
Buffalo Stallions players
Estudiantes de La Plata footballers
Major Indoor Soccer League (1978–1992) players
North American Soccer League (1968–1984) players
North American Soccer League (1968–1984) indoor players
Rochester Lancers (1967–1980) players
United Soccer League (1984–85) coaches
Association football midfielders
Argentine expatriate footballers
Argentine expatriate sportspeople in the United States
Expatriate soccer players in the United States
Rochester New York FC non-playing staff
Argentine football managers